Activating signal cointegrator 1 complex subunit 1 (ASCC1) is a protein that in humans is encoded by the ASCC1 gene.

References